Johny Srouji (Arabic: جوني سروجي; Hebrew: ג'וני סרוג'י; born 1964) is an Israeli executive, currently Apple's senior vice president of Hardware Technologies.

Early life and education 
Srouji was born in the Abbas neighborhood of Haifa, Israel, to a middle class Arab Christian family. He is the third child out of four, his father Farid was a carpenter and craftsman who produced casting molds to the specifications of the Israeli Ministry of Defense. In high school he received perfect grades in math, physics, chemistry and science, and was introduced to computers by an instructor who also taught at the nearby research university Technion – Israel Institute of Technology. He later enrolled at Technion, earning both a bachelor's degree (summa cum laude) and master's degree (magna cum laude) in computer science.

Srouji is reputed to be a no-nonsense executive, asking for hard truths and focusing on problems and areas for improvement. He is fluent in four languages: Arabic, Hebrew, French and English.

Career 
In 2008, Srouji led development of the Apple A4, the first Apple-designed system on a chip.

Srouji was responsible for setting up Apple’s R&D center in Herzliya, Israel, its second largest in the world.

In 2019 Intel considered Srouji a candidate to be its next CEO.

In 2020, during Apple's Worldwide Developers Conference (WWDC), Srouji announced the transition of Apple's Macintosh line of personal computers from Intel's x86 CPU architecture to their own Apple silicon.

In 2022, Srouji announced the opening of a third R&D center in Israel (after Herzliya and Haifa), in Jerusalem, focused on the next generation of Apple Silicon.

References 

Intel people
IBM people
Apple Inc. executives
Living people
Israeli Arab Christians
Technion – Israel Institute of Technology alumni
1964 births